Joseph T. Pillittere (June 26, 1932 – June 24, 2016) was an American politician who served in the New York State Assembly from the 138th district from 1979 to 1998.

He died on June 24, 2016, in North Tonawanda, New York at age 83.

References

1932 births
2016 deaths
Democratic Party members of the New York State Assembly